Schindler Holding Ltd. is a Swiss multinational company which manufactures escalators, moving walkways, and elevators worldwide, founded in Switzerland in 1874. Schindler produces, installs, maintains and modernizes lifts and escalators in many types of buildings including residential, commercial and high-rise buildings.

The company is present in over 140 countries and employs more than 66,000 people worldwide. The production facilities are located in Brazil, China, Slovakia, Spain, Switzerland, India and the United States. All operations and subsidiaries of Schindler Group are organised into Schindler Holding Ltd., which is publicly traded on SIX Swiss Exchange.

History
The company was founded in Lucerne, Switzerland in 1874, by Robert Schindler and Eduard Villiger, who established the collective joint partnership Schindler & Villiger. Shortly thereafter, a mechanical engineering workshop was built on an island in the river Reuss in Lucerne for the production of lifting equipment and machines of all types. Starting as an agricultural machinery manufacturer, it began to manufacture elevators at the end of the 19th century.

After 1901, Schindler's nephew, Alfred Schindler, expanded the company and founded the first foreign subsidiary in Berlin in 1906. Schindler produced ammunition during World War I. The company's first escalator was installed in 1936, and in 1937 it established a branch in Brazil. Following World War II Schindler became a global group and diversified its operations, manufacturing construction cranes, engines, pumps and railroad cars. In 1980 it became the first Western company to establish a joint venture with a state-owned enterprise of the People's Republic of China. With the takeover of Atlas in Brazil in 1999, Schindler became a major market player in South America.

Schindler entered the North American elevator market with the purchase of Toledo-based Haughton Elevator Company in 1979 - briefly branding their products as Schindler-Haughton. In 1989, the company dramatically increased its presence in the United States after acquiring the Elevator/Escalator division of Westinghouse, one of the largest producers of elevators and escalators at the time. Currently, Schindler Elevator Corporation, the United States operations of Schindler Group, is based in Morristown, New Jersey.

In February 2007, Schindler, along with competitors Otis Elevator Co., ThyssenKrupp, Kone, and Mitsubishi Elevator Europe were fined by the European Union for a price-fixing cartel. Schindler was fined 144 million euros, or about $189.3 million US dollars.

Since 2011, Schindler have sponsored Solar Impulse, a solar-powered aircraft.

In 2019, Schindler was awarded a multi-year contract to replace and install escalators in four downtown stations, for the Market Street Escalators Renovation Project of the San Francisco Bay Area Rapid Transit District.

See also

 List of elevator manufacturers
 Stadler Rail, purchased Schindler Waggon Altenrhein

References

External links
 

1970s initial public offerings
Companies listed on the SIX Swiss Exchange
Elevator manufacturers
Escalator manufacturers
Manufacturing companies of Switzerland
Manufacturing companies established in 1874
Multinational companies headquartered in Switzerland
Swiss brands
Swiss companies established in 1874